The following list includes all the known compositions of Kaikhosru Shapurji Sorabji sorted by instrumentation. Within the individual sections, the pieces are arranged by genre and chronologically.

The list of works found here is based on the information provided by Marc-André Roberge's Sorabji Resource Site. Since Sorabji's piece titles tend to contain various problems, Roberge's site amends them when necessary.

Works for orchestra with voices

Symphonies 
 No. 1 for Piano, Large Orchestra, Chorus, and Organ, KSS30 (1921–22; 300 pp.)
 The work bearing the name "Symphony II for Piano, Large Orchestra, Organ, Final Chorus, and Six Solo Voices" was intended as an orchestral work. Only the piano part (written 1930–31) was completed, yet it is one of Sorabji's longest piano compositions of all and has been described as self-sufficient. Roberge's catalogue renames it to Symphony No. 0 for Piano Solo (see the section on the piano symphonies for the full details of the item).
 No. 2, Jāmī, for Large Orchestra, Wordless Chorus, and Baritone Solo, KSS72 (1942–51; 826 pp.)
 I. (with chorus)
 II. (with chorus)
 III. (with chorus)
 IV. Cantico (with chorus and baritone)

Other 
 Messa grande sinfonica, for eight soloists, two choirs, and orchestra, KSS84 (1955–61; 1,001 pp.)
 I. Kyrie
 II. Gloria [with 11 settings of the text]
 [Passacaglia]
 [Interlude]
 [Di nuovo la passacaglia]
 III. Credo—Offertorium [the Credo with 6 settings of the text]
 IV. Sanctus [with 5 settings of the text]
 V. Pater noster [with 15 settings of the text]
 VI. Agnus dei [with 3 settings of the text]
 VII. Amen

Works for orchestra without voices

Piano concertos 
Numbered:
 No. 1, KSS6 (1915–16; 177 pp.)
 I. Modéré
 II. Très lent. Toujours enveloppé d'une atmosphère de chaleur tropicale et langoureuse
 III. Impétueux et impatient
 No. 2, KSS14 (1916–17; only two-piano version survives; 49 pp.)
 Modéré
 Lent
 Galvanique mais sans trop de hâte d'abord
 No. 3, KSS16 (1918; 100 pp.)
 Modérément animé, avec une expression très libre et fantaisiste
 Assez lent
 Vif et animé
 No. 4, KSS18 (1918; 100 pp.)
 I. Modérément animé
 II. Très lent
 III. Galvanique. Animé, mais pas trop vite
 No. 5, KSS27 (1920; 144 pp.)
 No. 6, KSS32 (1922; 144 pp.)
 I. Animé
 II. Lent
 III. Vif
 No. 7, Sīmurgh-‘Anqā, KSS38 (1924; 100 pp.)
 I. Assez animé, nerveux
 II. Lent mais pas traîné. Ordinairement très doux et "piano"
 III. Très animé
 No. 8, KSS45 (1927–28; 344 pp.)
 I. Ardito—focosamente
 II.
 III. Rude, sauvage et brutal
Unnumbered:
 Symphonic Variations for Piano and Orchestra, KSS78 (1935–37, 1953–56; Sorabji added an "Introitus" for orchestra alone and orchestrated the first volume [27 variations] of the three-book Symphonic Variations for Piano; 540 pp.)
 Opus clavisymphonicum—Concerto for Piano and Large Orchestra, KSS80 (1957–59; 333 pp.)
 I. Vivo
 II. Toccata; Cadenza fugata; Adagio–Epilogo
 Opusculum clavisymphonicum vel claviorchestrale, KSS94 (1973–75; 334 pp.)
 I. Moderatamente animato
 II. Variazioni sopra il Credo in qualsiasi modo del Gretchaninoff

Other 
 Chaleur—Poème, KSS15 (1916–17; 40 pp.)
 Opusculum for Orchestra, KSS34 (1923; 36 pp.)

Works for voice(s) and chamber ensemble 
 Music to "The Rider by Night" KSS22 (1919; libretto written by Robert Nichols; full score missing)
 Cinque sonetti di Michelagniolo Buonarroti, for baritone, flute, oboe, clarinet, bassoon, piano, and strings, KSS36 (1923; 40 pp.)
 "Tu sa' ch'i' so, signor mie, che tu sai"
 "Non so se s'è la desïata luce"
 "A che più debb'i' mai l'intensa voglia"
 "Veggio nel tuo bel viso, signor mio"
 "Se nel volto per gli occhi il cor si vede"

Works for bells 
 Suggested Bell-Chorale for St. Luke's Carillon, KSS82 (1961; 1 p.)

Works for voice and piano 
 The Poplars, KSS1 (1915; Ducic, translated by Selver; 2 versions; 3 pp.)
 Chrysilla, KSS2 (1915; de Régnier; 4 pp.)
 Roses du soir, KSS3 (1915; Louÿs; 4 pp.)
 L'heure exquise, KSS4 (1916; Verlaine; 2 pp.)
 Vocalise pour soprano fioriturata, KSS5 (1916; 2 versions; 3 pp.)
 Apparition, KSS7 (1916; Mallarmé; 5 pp.)
 Hymne à Aphrodite, KSS8 (1916; Tailhade; 2 versions; 5 pp.)
 L'étang, KSS10 (1917; Rollinat; 2 pp.)
 I Was Not Sorrowful—Poem for Voice and Piano [Spleen], KSS11 (between 1917 and 1919; Dowson; 3 pp.)
 Trois poèmes pour chant et piano, KSS21 (1918, 1919; Baudelaire and Verlaine; 9 pp.)
 Correspondances (Baudelaire)
 Crépuscule du soir mystique (Verlaine)
 Pantomime (Verlaine)
 Trois fêtes galantes de Verlaine, KSS37 (c. 1924?; 11 pp.)
 L'allée
 à la Promenade
 Dans la Grotte
 Le mauvais jardinier KSS11a (1919; Gilkin; only the first page is extant)
 Arabesque, KSS24 (1920; Shamsuʾd-Dīn Ibrāhīm Mīrzā; 2 pp.)
 Trois Poèmes du "Gulistān" de Saʿdī, KSS42 (1926, rev. 1930; translated by Toussaint; 16 pp.)
 La lampe
 La Jalousie
 La Fidelité
 L'irrémédiable, KSS44 (1927; Baudelaire; 8 pp.)
 Movement for Voice and Piano, KSS52 (1927, 1931; 9 pp.)
 Trois poèmes, KSS65 (1941; Verlaine and Baudelaire; 13 pp.)
 Le Faune (Verlaine)
 Les Chats (Baudelaire)
 La dernière fête galante (Verlaine)
 Frammento cantato, KSS88 (1967; Harold Morland; 1 p.)

Chamber works

Piano quintets 
 No. 1, KSS26 (1919–20; 72 pp.)
 No. 2, KSS54 (1932–33; 432 pp.)
 I. Introito; Fantasia; Coda–Finale
 II. Preludio; Passacaglia
 III. Adagio
 IV. Finale: Introduction; Allegro; Intermezzo; Coda–Epilogo

Other 
 Concertino non grosso for String Sextet with Piano obbligato quasi continuo, for 4 violins, viola, and cello, KSS89 (1968; 48 pp.)
 I. Vivace assai
 II. Adagio
 III. Finale. Vivace, leggiero
 Il tessuto d'arabeschi, for flute and string quartet, KSS99 (1979; 32 pp.)
 Fantasiettina atematica, for oboe, flute, and clarinet, KSS103 (1981; 2 pp.)

Works for piano

Symphonies 
 No. 0, KSS51 (1930–31; piano part of the otherwise unfinished Symphony II for Piano, Large Orchestra, Organ, Final Chorus, and Six Solo Voices; 333 pp.)
 I. Prologo; Introito; Fantasia; Cadenza; Coda–Stretta
 II. Adagio; Punta d'organo; Notturno–Fantasia; Ritournelle–point d'orgue
 III. Prelude; Toccata variata; Cadenza–fugata; Coda–Epilogo
 No. 1, Tāntrik, KSS60 (1938–39; 284 pp.)
 I. Mūlādhāra
 II. (Svādhiṣṭhāna)
 III. (Maṇipūra)
 IV. (Anāhata Cakra). Mormorando e morbidissimo
 V. Viśuddha
 VI. Ājñā
 VII. Sahasrāra [Padma]. Fuga libera a cinque voci
 No. 2, KSS75 (1954; 248 pp.)
 Parte Prima
 I. Intrecciata politematica
 Parte Seconda
 II. Aria fiorita: piuttosto notturno
 III. Moto perpetuo; Interludio; Coda
 Parte Terza
 IV. Fanfare; Introito; Toccata; Punta d'organo constanziata; Fuga
 V. Adagio–Finale
 No. 3, KSS81 (1959–60; in one continuous movement consisting of multiple sections; 144 pp.)
 No. 4, KSS85 (1962–64; 240 pp.)
 I. Moderatamente allegro
 II. Preludio corale; Interludio; Ostinato; Variazioni
 III. Finale
 No. 5, Symphonia brevis, KSS92 (1973; 120 pp.)
 I. Preludio; Intreccio; Stretta
 II. Adagio; Preludio quasi toccata; Aria fiorita; Interludio; Notturno; Nexus; Quasi fuga; Coda–Epilogo
 No. 6, Symphonia claviensis, KSS95 (1975–76; 270 pp.)
 Prima Parte
 I. Introito; Intrecciata; Interludio fugato; Coda–Epilogo
 Seconda Parte
 II. Preludio; Interludio placido; Animato quasi scherzo; Moto perpetuo; Ostinato
 III. Quasi adagio
 IV. Quasi Alkan
 Terza Parte
 V. Arabesque-Nocturne
 VI. Quasi fuga
 VII. Coda–Epilogo

Sonatas 
 No. 0, KSS9 (1917; discovered posthumously and unnumbered; 30 pp.)
 No. 1, KSS20 (1919; 42 pp.)
 No. 2, KSS28 (1920; 49 pp.)
 No. 3, KSS29 (1922; 75 pp.)
 No. 4, KSS48 (1928–29; 111 pp.)
 I. Vivo—arditamente
 II. Count Tasca's Garden
 III. Preludio; Fantasia; Cadenza; Fuga duplex quatuor vocibus; Coda–Stretta
 No. 5, Opus archimagicum, KSS58 (1934–35; 336 pp.)
 Pars prima: Arcana minora
 I. Fiero, ardito
 II. Presto, sotto voce inquieto
 III. Punta d'organo
 IV. Con fuoco, ardito e fiero
 Pars altera: Arcana majora
 V.
 VI. Adagio
 Pars tertia et ultima: Archimagus
 VII. Preludio
 VIII. Preludio-corale sopra "Dies irae"
 IX. Cadenza
 X. Fuga libera a cinque voci e tre soggetti

Multi-movement toccatas 
 No. 1, KSS46 (1928; 66 pp.)
 I. Preludio–Corale
 II. Passacaglia
 III. Cadenza
 IV. Fuga
 V. Coda–Stretta
 No. 2, KSS57 (1933–34; 111 pp.)
 I. Preludio-Toccata
 II. Preludio-Corale
 III. Scherzo
 IV. Aria
 V. Ostinato
 VI. Notturno
 VII. Interludio–Moto perpetuo. Riflesso del Preludio–Toccata
 VIII. Cadenza–Punta d'organo
 IX. Fuga libera a cinque voci
 No. 3, KSS76 (1955; 91 pp.)
 I. Movimento vivo
 II. Adagio
 III. Passacaglia
 IV. Cadenza
 V. Quasi fugato
 VI. Corranta
 VII. Fantasia
 VIII. Interludio
 IX. Cappriccio
 X. Epilogo
 No. 4, Toccata quarta, KSS87 (1964–67; 149 pp.)
 I. Theme [with 24 variations]; Nexus
 II. Quasi corale
 III. Intermezzo primo: Moto perpetuo; Punta d'organo; Aria
 IV. Passacaglia
 V. Intermezzo secondo. Of a neophyte and how the Black Art was revealed unto Him by the Fiend Asomuel
 VI. Cadenza–Toccata
 VII. Preludio adagio; Fuga quintuplex

Variation sets 
 Variazioni e fuga triplice sopra "Dies irae" per pianoforte, KSS41 (1923–26; 64 variations; the work is in two parts of 32 variations each; 201 pp.)
 Symphonic Variations for Piano, KSS59 (1935–37; 81 variations; in three books [each consisting of 27 variations], of which the first was later orchestrated; 484 pp.)
 Sequentia cyclica super "Dies irae" ex Missa pro defunctis, KSS71 (1948–49; 27 variations; 335 pp.)
 "Il gallo d'oro" da Rimsky-Korsakov: Variazioni frivole con una fuga anarchica, eretica e perversa (1978–79; 53 variations; 93 pp.)

Sets of aphoristic fragments 
 Frammenti aforistici (Sutras) (104), KSS90 (1962–64; 37 pp.)
 Frammenti aforistici (20), KSS86 (1964; 9 pp.)
 Frammenti aforistici (4), KSS96 (1977; 1 p.)

Transcriptions 
 Three Pastiches, KSS31 (1922; 17 pp.)
 Pastiche on the "Minute Waltz" by Chopin (1922)
 Pastiche on the Habanera from "Carmen" by Bizet (1922)
 Pastiche on the Hindu Merchant's Song from "Sadko" by Rimsky-Korsakov (1922)
 Rapsodie espagnole de Maurice Ravel—Transcription de concert pour piano, KSS33 (first version; 1923; 16 pp.)
 Pasticcio capriccioso sopra l'op. 64, no 1 del Chopin, KSS56 (1933; 8 pp.)
 Transcription in the Light of Harpsichord Technique for the Modern Piano of the Chromatic Fantasia of J. S. Bach, Followed by a Fugue, KSS61 (1940; 15 pp.)
 Rapsodie espagnole de Maurice Ravel—Transcription de concert pour piano, KSS67 (second version; 1945; 26 pp.)
 Transcription of the Prelude in E-flat by Bach, KSS68 (1945; based on BWV 815a; 4 pp.)
 Schlussszene aus "Salome" von Richard Strauss—Konzertmäßige Übertragung für Klavier zu zwei Händen, KSS70 (1947; transcription of the closing scene of Strauss' opera Salome; 25 pp.)

Other 
 Quasi habanera, KSS12 (1917; 6 pp.)
 Désir éperdu (Fragment), KSS13 (1917; 1 p.)
 Fantaisie espagnole, KSS19 (1919; 23 pp.)
 Two Piano Pieces, KSS17 (In the Hothouse [1918] and Toccata [1920]; 20 pp.)
 Prelude, Interlude, and Fugue for Piano, KSS25 (1920, 1922; 17 pp.)
 Le jardin parfumé—Poem for Piano Solo, KSS35 (1923; 16 pp.)
 Valse-fantaisie for Piano, KSS40 (1925; 16 pp.)
 Fragment: Prelude and Fugue on FxAxx DAxEx, KSS41a (1926; 3 pp.)
 Fragment Written for Harold Rutland, KSS43 (1926, 1928, 1937; 8 pp.)
 Nocturne, "Djāmī", KSS47 (1928; 28 pp.)
 Passacaglia, KSS48a (1929; unfinished; 41 pp.)
 Introduction, Passacaglia, Cadenza, and Fugue (2004; Alexander Abercrombie's completion of the unfinished 1929 Passacaglia; 79 pp.)
 Toccatinetta sopra C.G.F., KSS49 (1929; 8 pp.)
 Opus clavicembalisticum, KSS50 (1929–30; 253 pp.)
 Fantasia ispanica, KSS55 (1933; 54 pp.)
 Quaere reliqua hujus materiei inter secretiora, KSS62 (1940; based on the story "Count Magnus" by M. R. James; 16 pp.)
 "Gulistān"—Nocturne for Piano, KSS63 (1940; 28 pp.)
 St. Bertrand de Comminges: "He was laughing in the tower", KSS64 (1941; based on the story "Canon Alberic's Scrap-Book" by M. R. James; 16 pp.)
 Études transcendantes (100), KSS66 (1940–44; 456 pp.)
 Concerto da suonare da me solo e senza orchestra, per divertirmi, KSS69 (1946; 70 pp.)
 I. Incomincia l'orchestra arrogante e pomposa
 II.
 III. Scherzo diabolico
 Un nido di scatole sopra il nome del grande e buon amico Harold Rutland, KSS74 (1954; 26 pp.)
 Passeggiata veneziana sopra la Barcarola di Offenbach, KSS77 (1955–56; based on "Barcarolle" from Offenbach's The Tales of Hoffmann; 24 pp.)
 Rosario d'Arabeschi, KSS79 (1956; 45 pp.)
 Fantasiettina sul nome illustre dell'egregio poeta Christopher Grieve ossia Hugh M'Diarmid, KSS83 (1961; 10 pp.)
 Variazione maliziosa e perversa sopra "La morte d'Åse" da Grieg, KSS93 (1974; based on "The Death of Åse" from Grieg's Peer Gynt; 2 pp.)
 Symphonic Nocturne for Piano Alone, KSS97 (1977–78; 113 pp.)
 Villa Tasca: Mezzogiorno siciliano—Evocazione nostalgica e memoria tanta cara e preziosa del giardino meraviglioso, splendido, tropicale, KSS100 (1979–80; 47 pp.)
 Opus secretum atque necromanticum, KSS101 (1980–81; 48 pp.)
 Passeggiata variata sul nome del caro e gentile amico Clive Spencer-Bentley, KSS102 (1981; 3 pp.)
 Passeggiata arlecchinesca sopra un frammento di Busoni ("Rondò arlecchinesco"), KSS105 (1981–82; based on material from Busoni's Rondò Arlecchinesco; 16 pp.)
 Due sutras sul nome dell'amico Alexis, KSS104 (1981, 1984; 2 pp.)

Works for organ

Symphonies 
 No. 1, KSS39 (1924; 81 pp.)
 I. Prelude; Passacaglia; Postlude
 II. Introduction; [Quasi fugue]; Coda
 III. Moderato; Cadenza de' pedali; [Di nuovo il moderato]; Cadenza–Toccata; Coda–Stretto
 No. 2, KSS53 (1929–32; 350 pp.)
 I. Introduction
 II. Thema cum variationibus
 III. Finale: Preludio; Adagio; Toccata; Fuga triplex
 No. 3, KSS73 (1949–53; 305 pp.)
 I. Introito; Fantasia; Coda–Ripieno
 II. Grave; Corale–Fantasia; Ripieno
 III. Toccata; Passacaglia; Cadenza fantasiata; Fuga sextuplex

Works for baritone and organ 
 Benedizione di San Francesco d'Assisi, KSS91 (1973; 2 pp.)

Lost works 
 Transcription of "In a Summer Garden", piano transcription of Delius's 1908 orchestral piece In a Summer Garden (1914)
 Vocalise No. 2 (1916)
 Medea (1916)
 The Reiterated Chord (1916; only sketches survive)
 Black Mass (1922)
 Music for "Faust" (c. 1930)
 The Line (1932)
 Le agonie (1951)

Notes and references 
Notes

References

Sources 
 
 

Sorabji, Kaikhosru Shapurji